Hidalgo is a station on Line 2 and Line 3 of the Mexico City Metro system. It is located in the Cuauhtémoc borough of Mexico City, west of the city center, on Hidalgo Avenue and serves the Colonia Tabacalera, Colonia Guerrero, and Colonia Centro districts.

General information
Metro Hidalgo's name and logo evoke Miguel Hidalgo, the chief instigator of the Mexican War of Independence of 1810, after whom the nearby avenue is named. The station's icon depicts the profile of Hidalgo.

Metro Hidalgo was opened along Line 2 on 14 September 1970.  Service along Line 3 started on 20 November 1970.

The station also connects with trolleybus Line "LL", which runs between this metro station and the Colonia San Felipe de Jesús district. The station has an information desk, facilities for the handicapped and a cultural display.

The station is also close to Paseo de la Reforma, an important avenue that crosses downtown Mexico City and leads to Chapultepec Park. Some of the station exits are located on the west end of the Alameda Central, a large ornamental park. On the east end of the Alameda stands the Palacio de Bellas Artes.  On the west end, near Metro Hidalgo, is the Museo Mural Diego Rivera.

The nearby shrine to Saint Jude becomes a place of pilgrimage the 28th of each month.

Ridership

Nearby
Alameda Central, public urban park.
Museo Nacional de San Carlos, art museum devoted to European art.

Exits

Line 2
South: Paseo de la Reforma and Basilio Vadillo street, Colonia Tabacalera
North: Avenida Hidalgo and Héroes street, Colonia Tabacalera
Southeast: Balderas street and Paseo de la Reforma, Colonia Tabacalera
South: Eje 1 Poniente Rosales, Colonia Guerrero
North: Eje 1 Poniente Guerrero, Colonia Guerrero

Line 3
Southeast: Avenida Hidalgo and Balderas street, Colonia Centro
Northeast: Paseo de la Reforma and Avenida Hidalgo, Colonia Centro
East: Avenida Hidalgo, Colonia Centro

Gallery

See also 
 List of Mexico City metro stations

References

External links 

Hidalgo
Railway stations opened in 1970
1970 establishments in Mexico
Mexico City Metro Line 3 stations
Mexico City Metro stations in Cuauhtémoc, Mexico City
Accessible Mexico City Metro stations
Paseo de la Reforma
Alameda Central